In enzymology, an inositol 3-kinase is an enzyme that catalyzes the chemical reaction

ATP + myo-inositol  ADP + 1D-myo-inositol 3-phosphate

Thus, the two substrates of this enzyme are ATP and myo-inositol, whereas its two products are ADP and 1D-myo-inositol 3-phosphate.

This enzyme belongs to the family of transferases, specifically those transferring phosphorus-containing groups (phosphotransferases) with an alcohol group as acceptor.  The systematic name of this enzyme class is ATP:myo-inositol 1-phosphotransferase. Other names in common use include inositol-1-kinase (phosphorylating), myoinositol kinase, and myo-inositol 1-kinase.  This enzyme participates in inositol phosphate metabolism.

References

 
 
 

EC 2.7.1
Enzymes of unknown structure